Lqliâa (Berber: ⵍⵇⵍⵉⵄⴰ) is a city in Morocco, situated in the suburban area of Agadir. According to the 2014 Moroccan census it had a population of 83,235 inhabitants, up from the 46,432 inhabitants recorded in the 2004 census.

notable people 
Mourad Batna, professional moroccan footballer.

References

Populated places in Inezgane-Aït Melloul Prefecture
Municipalities of Morocco